Buck Township may refer to the following townships in the United States:

 Buck Township, Edgar County, Illinois
 Buck Township, Hardin County, Ohio
 Buck Township, Luzerne County, Pennsylvania

See also 
 Bucks Township, Tuscarawas County, Ohio